There are several organizations and public offices named Intellectual Property Office or Office for Intellectual Property, including:

 Barbados Corporate Affairs and Intellectual Property Office (CAIPO)
 Benelux Office for Intellectual Property (BOIP)
 Canadian Intellectual Property Office (CIPO)
 Ethiopian Intellectual Property Office (EIPO)
 Intellectual Property Office of the Philippines (IPOPHL)
 Intellectual Property Office (United Kingdom) (UK-IPO)
 Korean Intellectual Property Office (KIPO)
 State Intellectual Property Office of the People's Republic of China (SIPO)
 Taiwan Intellectual Property Office (TIPO)
 World Intellectual Property Office (WIPO)

See also 
 Intellectual property
 Intellectual property organization
 Industrial Property Office (disambiguation)
 National Industrial Property Institute (disambiguation) or INPI (disambiguation)
 Patent office

Intellectual property organizations